Brian Wesley Campbell (born May 23, 1979) is a Canadian former professional ice hockey defenceman. He played for the Buffalo Sabres, San Jose Sharks, Chicago Blackhawks and Florida Panthers of the National Hockey League (NHL). He won the Stanley Cup with the Blackhawks in 2010, assisting on the deciding goal.

Personal life
Campbell grew up in Strathroy, Ontario, where he attended elementary school at Colborne Street Public School and high school at Strathroy District Collegiate Institute. He also attended Canterbury High School in Ottawa, while playing for the Ottawa 67's of the Ontario Hockey League (OHL). His parents are Ed and Lorna. He has two brothers, Craig and Darryl. Darryl also played pro hockey for four seasons in the ECHL, lastly for the Mississippi Sea Wolves.

In 2003, Campbell was quarantined due to a potential SARS outbreak — a relative of Campbell, who worked at a hospital, had visited him just before the relative began to show SARS symptoms and was subsequently hospitalized. This led to the quarantine of both Campbell and then-teammate and roommate Rhett Warrener. Campbell missed three games before being cleared to play again. Neither player had any SARS symptoms.

Campbell and Lauren Miller got engaged during the 2011 NHL All-Star break.

Campbell has been given the nickname "Soupy" because he shares his surname with that of the Campbell Soup Company.

Campbell's jersey was retired by the Ottawa 67's' during their 50th anniversary season. It was officially retired on November 3, 2017, at TD Place Arena prior to a game against the Barrie Colts. Campbell is the fifth player to have their number retired by the Ottawa 67's.

Playing career

Early years
Campbell grew up playing minor hockey in his hometown of Strathroy, Ontario, where he won an OMHA Championship at the novice level. He also played AAA hockey for the Elgin-Middlesex Major Bantam Chiefs, along with future NHL teammate Joe Thornton, in 1993–94, which was the organization's inaugural year. In 1994–95, Campbell signed with the Petrolia Jets Jr.B. (OHA) of the Western Ontario Hockey League (WOHL).

Following his season with the Jets, Campbell was drafted by the Ottawa 67's. The 67's first-round pick that season was Nick Boynton, who would end up being a defence partner with Campbell for four seasons in Ottawa; they reunited 15 years later as teammates on the 2010 Stanley Cup-winning Chicago Blackhawks.

Campbell was taken by the Ottawa 67's in the OHL as a third-round draft pick in the 1995 OHL Priority Selection. In 1998–99, he won the Red Tilson Trophy as the OHL's Most Outstanding Player. He also won the Max Kaminsky Trophy as the OHL's Defenceman of the Year and the William Hanley Trophy as the OHL's Most Gentlemanly Player, CHL Player of the Year, and finally the Memorial Cup as Ottawa defeated Calgary 7–6 in overtime on home ice.

Buffalo Sabres
Campbell was drafted by the Buffalo Sabres as their sixth-round pick in the 1997 NHL Entry Draft. He played his first game for the Sabres in the 1999–2000 season and stayed with the team, wearing number 51, until February 26, 2008, when he was traded to San Jose. During the NHL lockout in 2004–05, he played for Jokerit in the Finnish SM-liiga and won the silver medal in the league championships.

On January 9, 2007, Campbell was the leading vote-getter amongst Eastern Conference defenceman for the 2007 NHL All-Star Game, earning him his first All-Star appearance. As a result of the Sabres' rotating captaincy policy, Campbell was named an alternate captain for the month of November 2007 and captain for the month of December. Campbell was then selected again to the 2008 NHL All-Star Game.

San Jose Sharks
The 2007–08 season was the final season Campbell was under contract with Buffalo. On February 26, 2008, at the NHL trade deadline, the Sabres traded Campbell, along with their seventh-round draft pick in the 2008 NHL Entry Draft (194th overall; Drew Daniels), to the San Jose Sharks in exchange for forward Steve Bernier and their 2008 first-round pick (26th overall; Tyler Ennis). The Sharks were eventually eliminated in the Western Conference Semi-finals by the Dallas Stars, and Campbell became a free agent at the conclusion of the season.

Campbell also led the NHL during the 2007–08 season in games played, being one of just two players to appear in 83 games, or one game more than a team's full schedule, because of his trade to San Jose; the other was Jeff Halpern. Campbell was named a member of the NHL Competition Committee on April 21, 2008.

Chicago Blackhawks
On July 1, 2008, Campbell signed an eight-year contract as an unrestricted free agent with the Chicago Blackhawks for roughly $7.1 million annually. Fox Chicago reported that Campbell chose to sign with the Blackhawks despite allegedly receiving better contract offers from other organizations. He played in all 82 of Chicago's regular-season games in the 2008–09 season, scoring seven goals to go with 45 assists. He contributed two goals with eight assists in 17 Stanley Cup playoff games that season as Chicago advanced to the Western Conference Finals, where they were eliminated by the Detroit Red Wings.

On March 14, 2010, Campbell was injured in a boarding incident caused by Washington Capitals captain Alexander Ovechkin. Ovechkin was assessed a major penalty and game misconduct for boarding, while Campbell did not return to the game. As a consequence of the illegal boarding hit, Ovechkin was suspended two games by the NHL. Campbell sustained a broken clavicle and broken rib, and was expected to miss seven-to-eight weeks. Despite this, Campbell managed to return by Game 4 of the first round of the 2010 playoffs against the Nashville Predators, igniting the team to a three-game win streak to knock Nashville out of the playoffs, four games to two. Campbell had played in 388 consecutive games prior to the injury. In the Finals, in Game 6, with the Blackhawks up three games to two in the series, Campbell recorded the lone assist on Patrick Kane's overtime game-winner to down the Philadelphia Flyers and clinch the Stanley Cup on June 9, 2010.

Florida Panthers
During the 2011 NHL Entry Draft, Campbell was dealt to the Florida Panthers in exchange for forward Rostislav Olesz. During his first season in Florida, Campbell had 49 assists to go with 4 goals for 53 points and only six penalty minutes, becoming the first defenceman since Red Kelly in the  season to win the Lady Byng Memorial Trophy for sportsmanship and gentlemanly conduct combined with a high standard of playing ability.

Return to Chicago
On July 1, 2016, Campbell signed a one-year contract as an unrestricted free agent with Chicago for roughly $2 million in base salary, with additional performance-related bonuses included.

On July 17, 2017, Campbell announced his retirement, but also that he would join the Blackhawks' business operations department where he will be assisting with various marketing, community relations, and youth hockey initiatives.

International play
Campbell was a member of Team Canada at the 1999 World Junior Championships, and was named a First Team All-Star for the tournament. After completion of the Panthers' 2012–13 season, Campbell extended his availability to make his long-awaited senior debut for Canada at the 2013 World Championships in Sweden and Finland.

Career statistics

Regular season and playoffs

International

Awards

References

External links

 

1979 births
Living people
Buffalo Sabres captains
Buffalo Sabres draft picks
Buffalo Sabres players
Canadian expatriate ice hockey players in Finland
Canadian ice hockey defencemen
Chicago Blackhawks coaches
Chicago Blackhawks players
Florida Panthers players
Ice hockey people from Ontario
Jokerit players
Lady Byng Memorial Trophy winners
National Hockey League All-Stars
Ottawa 67's players
People from Strathroy-Caradoc
Rochester Americans players
San Jose Sharks players
Stanley Cup champions